Rufus B. Dodge Jr. (November 24, 1861 – December 13, 1935) was an American lawyer and politician who served as the mayor of Worcester, Massachusetts.

Early life
Dodge was born in Charlton, Massachusetts on November 24, 1861.

Education
Dodge graduated Cum Laude from the Boston University School of Law in 1885.

Public service

Clinton, Massachusetts School Committee
Dodge was elected to the Clinton, Massachusetts school committee when he was twenty years old.

Worcester, Massachusetts Board of Aldermen
Dodge served on the Worcester Board of Aldermen from 1893 to 1895, serving as the Board's President in 1895.

Mayor of Worcester, Massachusetts
In December 1897 Dodge was elected, as a Republican, the Mayor of Worcester, he served as Mayor from January 3, 1898 to February 25, 1901.  Dodge's term was extended and he served until February 25, 1901 because there was a tie vote for Mayor in the election of December 1900.

Family
Dodge's wife was Mary C. Perry, a botanical collector.

Notes

External links
Worcester Mayors

1861 births
Boston University School of Law alumni
Massachusetts city council members
Mayors of Worcester, Massachusetts
Massachusetts lawyers
Massachusetts Republicans
1935 deaths
People from Charlton, Massachusetts